Chancellor Ridge is a ridge in Antarctica, between Walcott Glacier and Howchin Glacier in the Royal Society Range, Victoria Land. It was named by the New Zealand Geographic Board (1994) in association with Chancellor Lakes near the east end of the ridge.

See also
Brandau Crater
Howchin Glacier

References
 

Ridges of Victoria Land
Scott Coast